Temmie Ovwasa (born 29 November 1996) popularly known as YBNL princess, is a Nigerian singer, songwriter and artist. They signed a record deal with YBNL Nation in August 2015 but left the label in 2020 after having a disagreement with the label owner Olamide. Ovwasa is openly lesbian and non-binary.  In 2020, they dropped the first openly gay album in Nigeria.

Early life 
Ovwasa was born on November 29, 1996 in Ilorin, to a father from Delta state and mother from Osun state. They had their basic education at Grace Christian Schools and their secondary school education at Dalex Royal College, both in Ilorin Kwara state.  They studied Medical Anatomy at Ladoke Akintola University of Technology.

Music career 
They started singing at an early age of eight when they wrote their first song and was part of their church choir and due to their musical talent, their mother gave them their first guitar when they were 12. They shot to limelight in 2015 when Olamide reached out to them via Instagram and was then signed to YBNL record label which earned them the name YBNL princess and left YBNL after a disagreement with the label boss.

Discography

Album
 E be like say dem swear for me (2020)

Singles
  Afefe (2016)
  Jabole  (2016)
  Bamidele  (2017)
  Holy Water  (2018)
  Osunwemimo  (2020)
 Elejo wewe  (2020)

References 

Living people
Nigerian singer-songwriters
1996 births
Lesbian musicians
Non-binary musicians
Nigerian LGBT people
Nigerian LGBT rights activists